Qeshlaq-e Molla Naqi may refer to:
 Qeshlaq-e Molla Naqi Aqam Owghlan
 Qeshlaq-e Molla Naqi Qanbar